What It Takes is an EP by Canadian rapper Choclair, released independently in 1997 on Knee Deep Records. It spawned the 12" single "What It Takes Remix", and a music video of the title track was released in 1996. The EP won the award for Best Rap Recording at the 1997 Juno Awards.

Track listing
All songs produced by Day.

References

1997 debut EPs
Choclair albums
Hip hop EPs
Juno Award for Rap Recording of the Year recordings